AAMF or AAmF may refer to:

 Asociación Amateurs de Football, football association (1919–1926), Argentina
 Atlin Arts & Music Festival, Canada